The 2017 Campeonato Cearense is the 103rd season of Ceará's top football league. Ceará won the league for the 44th time.

Format
First Round
All the ten teams play each other once.
The top eight teams go to the Final Rounds.
The bottom two teams are relegated.
Final Rounds
The eight teams are paired according to their ranking:
1 vs. 8 (Game 1)
2 vs. 7 (Game 2)
3 vs. 6 (Game 3)
4 vs. 5 (Game 4)
The games are played over two legs. The better teams hosts the second leg.
The winners are again paired according to their ranking:
Winners Game 1 vs. Winners Game 4
Winners Game 2 vs. Winners Game 3
The games are this time played over three legs. When a team wins a leg, they gain three points. When a leg is tied, each team gets one point, and when a team loses, they gain zero points. The team with the most points at the end of the three legs moves on. If one team wins the first two legs, no third leg is played. The better team hosts the second and third legs.
The winners of the semi-finals go on to the final, played the same way as the semi-finals.
Qualification
The top two teams not already playing in Série A, Série B, orSérie C, or already assured qualification to Série D qualify for the 2018 Campeonato Brasileiro Série D.
The winner and runner-up qualify for the 2018 Copa do Brasil.
The winner and runner-up qualify for the 2018 Copa do Nordeste.

Teams

First round

Final Rounds

Quarter-finals

Ceará win 7–2 on Aggregate.

Guarani de Juazeiro win 6–2 on Aggregate.

Ferroviário-CE win on penalties after a 2–2 tie on Aggregate

Fortaleza wins 6–2 on Aggregate

Semi-finals

Ferroviário-CE win with 5 points, to Fortaleza's 2 points

Ceará win with 7 points to Guarani de Juazeiro's 1 point.

Final

A third match was not necessary. Ceará wins with 6 points to Ferroviário-CE's 0 points.

Ferroviário-CE and Guarani de Juazeiro qualify for 2018 Campeonato Brasileiro Série DCeará and Ferroviário-CE qualify for the 2018 Copa do Brasil.Ceará and Ferroviário-CE qualify for the 2018 Copa do Nordeste.

Topscorers

References

2017 in Brazilian football